Artilleriyskiy Tyagach Sredniy - 59, or ATS-59 (from , meaning medium artillery tractor) was a Soviet Cold War era artillery tractor.

The ATS-59G has a larger cab seating 7 people in two rows. The T-55 tank engine was used and an overpressure NBC system was added. Otherwise the chassis and payload capacity remained unaltered.

The AT-S was developed as the successor for the AT-59. It retained the same payload and towing capability, but had a higher speed, longer range and improved off road capability.

External links

ATS-59 Medium Tracked Artillery Tractor

Artillery tractors
Military vehicles of the Soviet Union